Candes-Saint-Martin is a commune in the Indre-et-Loire department, central France. It overlooks the confluence of the Vienne and Loire rivers from a steep hill on the left bank of the Loire, and marks the boundary between the modern departments of Indre-et-Loire to the east, and Maine-et-Loire to the west.

Name

The name Candes is thought to derive from a Gallic word for confluence, and is found in several other similarly sited towns in the region; the termination Saint-Martin was formally added in 1949, although it had been in common usage for many years.
Evidence of Gallo-Roman occupation was found in 19th century excavations, particularly in the grounds of the Bishop's Palace which crowns the hill.

The village takes its name - and its main claim to fame- from the magnificent church which  has succeeded the 4th century monastery where St Martin, Bishop of Tours and 'Apostle to the Gauls', died in 397.

Population

See also
Communes of the Indre-et-Loire department

References

Communes of Indre-et-Loire
Plus Beaux Villages de France